Don't Need Much is the debut album from English punk rock band Great Cynics. It was released through Household Name Records in June 2011.

Track listing

Personnel
Great Cynics
Giles Bidder - Vocals/Guitar
Bob Barrett - Drums

Other Musicians
Peter Miles - Bass

References

2011 debut albums
Great Cynics albums
Household Name Records albums